Dutch Settlement is a Canadian rural community`in Halifax Regional Municipality, Nova Scotia.

Situated in the Shubenacadie Valley, Dutch Settlement is part of the Halifax Regional Municipality and is serviced by Route 277.

It was originally called Keyes after William Keys (Keyes) in 1786. The present name is a tribute to the number of German immigrants who moved to the area. The word "Dutch" is an anglicized version of "Deutsch".

The community is immediately adjacent to the communities of Carroll's Corner and Lantz.

Communications
 First three digits of postal code B2S
 Telephone exchange 902 883

References
History Of Dutch Settlement
Location Map
Explore HRM

Communities in Halifax, Nova Scotia
General Service Areas in Nova Scotia